Anne Ishii is a writer, editor, translator, and producer based in New York City. Anne is the host of WHYY's Movers & Makers, and the curator of Philadelphia’s Asian Arts Initiative, the arts non-profit.

Producer 

Ishii is a producer of bara manga. Her work includes The Passion of Gengoroh Tagame: Master of Gay Erotic Manga, and Massive: Gay Japanese Manga and the Men Who Make It, edited alongside Graham Kolbeins, featuring manga artists Gengoroh Tagame, Jiraiya, Seizoh Ebisubashi, Kazuhide Ichikawa, Inu Yoshi, Takeshi Matsu, Gai Mizuki and Poosukeh Kumada, with artwork by Chip Kidd. In 2013, Ishii founded Massive Goods with Graham Kolbeins, a line of Bara Japanese manga and paraphernalia tied to their graphic novel of the same name.

She is the translator of the English version of Tagame's manga My Brother's Husband.

Published works 

Ishii's translation credits include the Aranzi Machine Gun series, Aranzi Aronzo Fun Dolls (Let's Make Cute Stuff), The Cute Book, The Bad Book, Gunji, and Bat-Manga!: The Secret History of Batman in Japan.

Formerly with Vertical, she is the editor-in-chief of They're All So Beautiful and Paperhouses. As a writer, Ishii has been published by The Village Voice, Slate, Publishers Weekly, Guernica, Giant Robot, and Asian American Writers' Workshop.

Further reading

 Randle, Chris. "Size Matters: An Interview With Anne Ishii," The Hairpin, December 31, 2014.
 Rondinelli, David. "Editor, Anne Ishii Knows What Makes Manga Massive!," Geeks Out, March 19, 2015.

References

External links
 
 

Living people
Female comics writers
American writers of Japanese descent
Year of birth missing (living people)